The 5th North-West Legislative Assembly lasted from 1902 until dissolution in 1905. This was the largest membership of any Assembly in the Northwest Territories of Canada, and the only one that truly had political parties. It was also the last one to be fully elected and have a speaker until 1975 and the last one to have a premier and executive council until 1980. It was dissolved due to the division of Alberta and Saskatchewan from the territories.

Member changes after the election 
Daniel Maloney, the member for St. Albert was unseated for bribery in 1903, and subsequently lost the by-election to fill the seat to Louis Joseph Alphonse Lambert by a vote of 363 to 332.

References

Further reading

External links
Election Results and Dates 1876 - 1905 from Saskatchewan Archives

005